Langkawi Sky Bridge is a  curved pedestrian cable-stayed bridge in Malaysia, completed in 2005. The Langkawi Sky Bridge can be reached by first taking the Langkawi Cable Car to the Top Station, where an inclined lift called SkyGlide takes visitors from the Top Station down to the bridge.

The bridge was closed in July 2012 for maintenance and upgrading.  The reopening was put off several times, but it partially reopened in February 2015.  The bridge is now fully accessible.

Design and construction

Design and layout
It has steel railings as well as steel wire meshes on both sides of the bridge. It was designed by Peter Wyss as a curved walkway to maximise the viewing experience, providing shifting perspective as a visitor walks along the bridge. The walkway, formed of steel and concrete panels set on top of an inverted triangular truss, connects two hilltops at Gunung Mat Chinchang. The first  of the bridge is straight, followed by three curved  sections, then a final straight  section. At each end of the walkway, the bridge has a 3.6m-wide triangular viewing platform that serves as resting and viewing areas for visitors.

It is tilted from the vertical, at angles of 12° and 2° in two planes, and stabilized by two main back-stay cables, anchored into opposite hillsides. The two ends of the curved bridge deck are connected to two triangular viewing platforms on opposite hilltops. The bridge is designed to carry a up to 250 people.

Construction
The bridge was pre-fabricated in segments and lifted to the top of the mountain using Russian Kamov helicopters. The entire bridge was then assembled in its current position beside the pylon.  Helicopters were also used in the erection of the two triangular end platforms, the pylon, and the initial central segment of the deck. Because of instability in the deck segment, the remaining deck segments, of which there were fourteen, were assembled using more conventional working cable and winch system, with a winch at each end platform and the working cable strung to the pylon. The bridge roughly cost $1.2 million to construct.  The bridge was constructed in 12 months between August 2003 and August 2004.  It was opened to the public in February 2005.

2012 upgrade
In July 2012, the bridge was closed for maintenance, upgrading and structural strengthening.  The whole structure would be of stainless steel, and when it is finished, it would have sections of glass walkway in the wider central curved section so that visitors may look down the valley from where they stand, and an inclined elevator or lift called SkyGlide that brings visitors from the top station down to the bridge.

The bridge reopened in February 2015, although access was for a time still limited as the SkyGlide was not finished until December 2015.

SkyGlide

An inclinator called SkyGlide and a new platform were built linking the Langkawi Cable Car's Top Station and the Sky Bridge, taking passengers down to the Sky Bridge.  It opened in December 2015.  The SkyGlide cabin can accommodate 12 passengers or  load per trip, and the ride lasts about two minutes.  The ticket for the SkyGlide is sold separately at the Top Station.

A cheaper alternative to the SkyGlide is for visitors to walk 10–20 minutes along a steep and less secure mountain track between the Top Station and the Sky Bridge.

Popular media
The last scene of the 2006 Indian movie Don: The Chase Begins Again was filmed here.
The 2007 Tamil movie Billa  starring Ajith Kumar was also filmed here.

Technical information
 Overall length of curved walkway: 
 Area of the bridge: 
 Pylon height: 
 Maximum capacity: 250 people.

Gallery

References

External links

 Official website Panorama Langkawi
 Google Map Photo at panoramio.com
 15 photos from different angles
 Nearby hotel and resorts

Buildings and structures in Kedah
Cable-stayed bridges in Malaysia
Pedestrian bridges in Malaysia
Langkawi
Transport in Kedah
Tourist attractions in Kedah